Velta Skurstene (19 December 1930 – 12 November 2022) was a Latvian stage, radio, and film actress. She acted in various Latvian films, including "Kapteiņa Enriko pulkstenis", "Dāvana vientuļai sievietei", "Meldru mežs", "Un rasas lāses rītausmā", "Džimlai Rūdi rallallā!".

Skurstene died on 12 November 2022, at the age of 91.

References

1930 births
2022 deaths
Latvian stage actresses
Soviet stage actresses
Latvian film actresses
Latvian radio actresses
20th-century Latvian actresses